Potima (Greek:Πότιμα) is an area in Paphos, Cyprus. This area is also called Potima Bay. The name Potima is taken from the Greek word potizo (ποτίζω) because this area was the first that had water.  Is situated near the village of Kissonerga and near the Coral Bay area. The area is well connected by public transport and has several restaurants and a celebrated view.

In the area of Potima a main road passes through, connecting the north with the south Paphos villages. The biggest percentage of the Potima area is property of the government and there are not any buildings or any other constructions. There are only greenhouses, banana plantations and fruit trees. One of the reason is that, the surrounding areas are sealing mostly with the agriculture and they can only cultivate the land.
There are plans to start building a new project, Paphos Marina, in this area. The Paphos Marina is the first Marina in Paphos. This project will bring huge growth for the surrounding areas. The marina will be able to moor approximately 1000 vessels and will also contain restaurants, bars, other shops and further leisure facilities. A large number of jobs will be created and demand for rental accommodation will increase tremendously.

External links
www.potimamarina.com

Geography of Cyprus